Tony Dodds (born 16 June 1987) is a New Zealand triathlete.

Dodds was born in 1987 in Balclutha and grew up in Wānaka. He came tenth at the Men's triathlon at the 2014 Commonwealth Games in Glasgow. While in Barcelona with the New Zealand team in July 2015, he had his belongings stolen twice. He represented New Zealand at the 2016 Summer Olympics.

References

External links
 
 
 

Living people
1987 births
Olympic triathletes of New Zealand
New Zealand male triathletes
Triathletes at the 2016 Summer Olympics
Triathletes at the 2018 Commonwealth Games
Commonwealth Games competitors for New Zealand
20th-century New Zealand people
21st-century New Zealand people